In musical instructions, tastiera can refer to:

 Musical keyboard, on keyboard instruments
 Fingerboard, on string instruments